Winner Andrew Anacona Gomez (born 11 August 1988) is a Colombian professional road cyclist, who currently rides for UCI ProTeam .

Career

Lampre–ISD (2012–14)
He impressed the  team managers after getting second place of the 2011 Girobio, a smaller version of the Giro d'Italia for younger riders. The team signed him for 2012 and 2013. In December 2012, Anacona was injured in a training crash, after he collided with a dog. He suffered a broken peroneal malleolus and dislocated his ankle bone.

In the mountainous 2014 Tour of Utah, Anacona helped his leader Chris Horner obtain the second place of the race, taking the third step of the podium himself. On the mountaintop finish of Stage 9 of the 2014 Vuelta a España, Anacona almost took the leader's jersey by soloing to the line for the stage victory. He attacked from a breakaway of 31 riders and missed the top spot in the overall classification by a mere 9 seconds.

Movistar Team (2015–19)
He was named in the start list for the 2015 Tour de France.

Arkéa–Samsic
In September 2019, it was announced that Anacona – along with Dayer Quintana and Nairo Quintana – was moving to the  team for the 2020 season.

Personal
Anacona was named after cyclists Peter Winnen and Andrew Hampsten, but due to a mistake, his first name became Winner instead of Winnen.

Major results

2006
 National Junior Track Championships
1st  Team pursuit
1st  Points race
 1st  Time trial, National Junior Road Championships
2009
 10th Gran Premio Industrie del Marmo
2010
 2nd Time trial, National Under-23 Road Championships
 8th Overall Girobio
 10th Trofeo Gianfranco Bianchin
2011
 2nd Overall Girobio
1st Stage 5
 6th Trofeo Gianfranco Bianchin
2012
 10th Overall Tour of Slovenia
2014
 1st Stage 9 Vuelta a España
 2nd Road race, National Road Championships
 3rd Overall Tour of Utah
2015
 6th Overall Vuelta a Burgos
2016
 6th Overall Vuelta a Castilla y León
 9th Overall Abu Dhabi Tour
2019
 1st  Overall Vuelta a San Juan
1st Stage 5
 4th Overall Tour of Austria
 8th Circuito de Getxo
2020
 3rd Prueba Villafranca de Ordizia
2021
 1st Trofeo Andratx – Mirador d’Es Colomer
2022
 1st  Mountains classification, Route d'Occitanie

Grand Tour general classification results timeline

References

External links

Winner Anacona Gomez profile at Lampre-ISD

1988 births
Living people
Colombian male cyclists
People from Tunja
2014 Vuelta a España stage winners
Colombian Vuelta a España stage winners
Sportspeople from Boyacá Department
21st-century Colombian people